The William J. and Hattie J. Zitterell House is a historic residence located in Webster City, Iowa, United States.  Zitterell was a general
contractor, and he served as president of the Iowa Master Builders Association twice.  He built his Queen Anne-style house that was completed in 1901.  The two-story frame structure features three porches, a balcony, and a corner tower with a conical roof.  There is a gazebo-like projection on the wrap-around porch.  The main block is capped with a hipped roof with four gables.  It was listed on the National Register of Historic Places in 1982.

References

Houses completed in 1901
Queen Anne architecture in Iowa
Houses on the National Register of Historic Places in Iowa
Buildings and structures in Hamilton County, Iowa
National Register of Historic Places in Hamilton County, Iowa